Peter Gerald "Gerry" Malone (born 21 July 1950) is a British Conservative Party politician who served as a member of Parliament (MP) from 1983 to 1987 and again from 1992 to 1997.

Early life
Born in Glasgow, Malone was educated at St Aloysius' College, Glasgow, and attended the University of Glasgow.

Early career

Glasgow candidacies
He was the Conservative candidate at the February 1974 general election for Glasgow Provan, where he was defeated by Labour's Hugh Brown. He made other unsuccessful attempts to be elected to the House of Commons at Glasgow Pollok at the October 1974 general election, Roxburgh, Peebles and Selkirk at the 1979 general election, and the Glasgow Hillhead by-election in 1982 (where he lost the traditionally Conservative seat to Roy Jenkins of the Social Democratic Party).

MP for Aberdeen South
He was elected as MP for Aberdeen South at the 1983 general election, in a landslide victory for the Conservative Party, but lost the seat to Frank Doran of Labour at the 1987 general election. During this time he served as an assistant Government whip, from 10 February 1986 to 15 June 1987.

Re-entering Parliament

MP for Winchester
He re-entered Parliament in 1992, representing the "safe" Conservative seat of Winchester. 

In May 1992 Malone became a deputy chairman of the Conservative Party, joining incumbent Dame Angela Rumbold in the post. He left the post in July 1994 and was succeeded by Rumbold, Michael Dobbs and John Maples.

He was appointed a minister of state at the Department of Health in 1994, when Virginia Bottomley was the secretary of state.

1997 contested seat of Winchester
Malone unexpectedly lost his Winchester seat at the 1997 general election by two votes, to the Liberal Democrat candidate Mark Oaten. Malone challenged the result in the high court, and it was declared void, causing a by-election. Malone trailed Oaten by 21,566 votes in the resulting by-election.

Commercial chairmanships
Malone was chairman of Regent-GM, a supplier of generic drugs to the National Health Service (NHS) and a subsidiary of Nadhmi Auchi's General Mediterranean Holding. The company was wound up in 2004 after being accused of colluding with five other pharmaceuticals companies to overcharge the NHS for drugs.

Malone served until September 2014 as a non-executive chairman of Ultrasis, which specialises in computerised cognitive behavioural therapy software.

He is currently chairman of a range of US mutual funds and serves on the board of the Washington-based Mutual Funds Directors Forum (MFDF); Malone is a director of two US healthcare companies, Bionik Labs and Medality Medical.

Writer and broadcaster 
Malone was Scottish editor of The Sunday Times from 1987 to 1990 and a broadcaster on BBC Radio Scotland and Radio Clyde from 1987 to 1992. He is currently opera critic of Reaction.life, an online news, commentary and arts publication.

References

External links
 

|-

1950 births
Living people
People educated at St Aloysius' College, Glasgow
Alumni of the University of Glasgow
UK MPs 1983–1987
UK MPs 1992–1997
Conservative Party (UK) MPs for English constituencies
Scottish Conservative Party MPs
Members of the Parliament of the United Kingdom for Aberdeen constituencies
Scottish chief executives
Politics of Winchester
Politicians from Glasgow
Businesspeople in the health care industry